The Battle of Samara Bend, also known as the Battle of Kernek, was the first battle between the Volga Bulgaria and the Mongol Empire. It is famous for being the first battle that the Mongol Horde lost. The battle took place during the autumn of 1223 at the southern border of Volga Bulgaria. The battle began with the Bulgar forces retreating and the Mongols pursuing them, leading them successfully into a Bulgar ambush. The Bulgars then countered the Mongols, leading to a victory for the Bulgars.

Background

Volga Bulgars 
The Bulgars were nomadic Turkic tribes originally from the Pontic–Caspian steppe just north of the Black Sea. In the mid-7th century, the group split; some migrated westward to Central Europe, forming the First Bulgarian Empire in the Balkans, while others migrated northeastward towards the confluence of the Volga and Kama rivers near modern-day Kazan, founding Volga Bulgaria. The Volga Bulgars converted to Islam after it was declared the official state religion in 922, establishing significant trade between the Islamic world and Europe.

Despite peaceful relations with Kievan Rus' during the 10th and 11th centuries, the principality of Vladimir-Suzdal began expanding its territory in the middle Volga region during the 12th century, and subsequent disputes over trade in the region resulted in hostilities with the Volga Bulgars.

The conquest led the Bulgars to establish a new capital at Bilar (also known as Biljarsk or Biler), and the weakening of the Volga-Bulgar state.

Mongol expedition to the Dnieper 

On 12 January 1221, Shah Muhammad II of Khwarezm died while retreating from the Mongols on the island of Abeskum during Genghis Khan's destruction of the Khwarezmid Empire. Upon hearing the news of the Shah's death, Genghis Khan summoned his general, Subutai, to Samarkand. Subutai offered him advice on how best to defeat the new Shah, Jalal ad-Din Mingburnu. He requested not to be part of the final campaign, and instead proposed to reconnoiter the west bank of the Caspian Sea and the steppes beyond. Genghis Khan accepted this plan and assigned two tumens (totaling 20,000 soldiers) to Subutai and another to Jebe, another one of the Khan's generals, under the condition that the campaign did not take more than two years and that on their return they find and join with the Khan's son Jochi in the east to engage the Volga Bulgars. Subutai rejoined Jebe at their camp near the Caspian at the delta of the Kura river. The "reconnaissance in force" began at the end of February 1221. The Mongols then invaded Georgia and decimated George IV of Georgia's much larger forces on the plain of Khuman, sacking Mariah and Hamadan.

The Mongol forces crossed the Caucasus with significant difficulty during the winter. After crossing, they met an army of some 50,000 allied Circassians, Alans, and Lezgins, who were joined by Cumans; the Cuman forces were further bolstered by their Volga Bulgar, Khazar, and Avar allies under the command of their khagan Kotian's brother, Yuri, and son, Daniel. After an inconclusive first battle, the Mongols bribed the Cumans to abandon their allies by promising them half their spoils from Georgia. The Cumans broke camp during the night, leaving their allies to the Mongol horde, who sacked the camp and impressed the survivors they considered useful into their army. 

The Mongols later overtook and massacred the fleeing Cumans, among whom were Yuri and Daniel. In addition to this victory, the Mongols also recovered their treasure used for the bribe. Upon hearing the news of this defeat, many Cumans fled west to the borders of Hungary and the Byzantine Empire's trading station on the Sea of Azov.

The Mongols sacked Astrakhan, after which Subutai and Jebe split their forces. Subutai marched south to the Sea of Azov to ensure that the Cumans could not threaten them from the rear, while Jebe marched to the Don river to await him. Subutai's force attacked and razed settlements along the shore, massacring any Cumans they encountered. It was during these advances that the Mongols encountered Venetian merchants for the first time. Subutai made a pact with them to destroy their Genoese rivals' trading posts in exchange for information and military intelligence on the west.

In accordance with the pact, Subutai destroyed the Genoese trading station of Soldaia (Sudak) in Crimea, after which he rejoined Jebe. The Mongol forces were then composed of perhaps 25,000 men, who marched unopposed to the Dniester river. In the meantime, Jebe had allied with the chief of the Brodnici, Polskinia, and 5,000 Brodnici troops joined his forces on the Don.

In the autumn and winter of 1222, the Mongol army marched up and down the Dniester, frequently resorting to scare tactics to discourage attacks. Scouting parties were sent as far west as possible to gather military intelligence on southern Kievan Rus' and the states along the borders of the Carpathian Mountains. Their objective completed, the Mongols began their march home.

Retreat and pursuit by Cuman and Ruthenian forces 

The Cuman leader, Kotian, had fled north with the remnants of the Cumans and pleaded for an alliance with the Ruthenian (Rus') princes against the Mongols at a conference. The Ruthenian princes of Galicia (Mstislav the Daring), Kursk, Kiev, and Chernihiv agreed to join Kotian to stop the Mongols. Duke Yuri of Suzdal also promised to send an army under the command of his nephew, the Prince of Rostov. The nominal strength of this allied force was 80,000 men.

The Mongols learned that military action was being planned against them by their spies and scouts; the allied Rus' and Cuman forces approached the Mongol position from several directions. The Mongols were still under the Khan's orders to suppress the Volga Bulgars, but this could not be safely done with enemies in their rear, and the elimination of the incoming Ruthenian threats was a military necessity. They crossed the Dnieper where the expected rendezvous with Jochi did not take place; Jochi was supposedly ill and delayed in the east. After Mongol ambassadors to the Princes of Chernihiv and Kiev were killed, they declared war.

Subutai and Jebe left one thousand men under the command of Hamabek on the east bank of the Dnieper to delay the Ruthenian crossing—this rearguard was able to inflict heavy casualties but was eventually overwhelmed and destroyed, and Hamabek was captured and executed. In May 1223, the Mongols retreated over the steppes north of the Sea of Azov, land that they knew well. Although their mobility allowed them to easily outpace the Rus' forces, they instead decided to confront them. On 31 May 1223, they stopped along the western bank of the river Kalka (Kalmyus). In the ensuing Battle of the Kalka River, Mongol forces of perhaps 23,000 exterminated the combined Cuman-Ruthenian army, which may have numbered 80,000 men, only 25–30% of which were experienced warriors. The Mongol tactics and weaponry, with which the Ruthenians had no prior experience, were superior to the rather unorganized assault by the allied armies. The Mongols pursued the remnants of the allied forces to the Dneiper, where the Prince of Kiev had retreated with his army mostly intact, not having been part of the reckless charges at Kalka; however, they were overtaken by the Mongols and eventually massacred in their fortified camp. The Prince of Rostov stopped and returned with his army to Suzdal upon the news of the defeat at Kalka to prepare for an attack, but it never came. The Mongols had resumed their march east.

The Mongol campaign had killed as many as 200,000 soldiers from various nations and, up until this point, had never lost a major battle. At this point in history, the Mongol army was the finest in the world—it was professional and extremely well-trained and equipped. A Mongol rose through the ranks based on his merit rather than his position in Mongol society, and generals such as Jebe, Subutai, and the Great Khan had developed revolutionary tactics all controlled with iron discipline. Its mobility was unmatched by any other military force. Using the Mongolian horse (steppe pony) allowed the survival of their steeds in areas where other horses would have starved or otherwise died from conditions. Mongol commanders also realized the quality of their army and were not impressed by the mere size of the opposing forces of their enemies. They could stand and hold, and their tactics would often cause an enemy to break and retreat in a panic that inevitably led to a rout by Mongol mounted archers and lancers. They often employed siege engines and engineers from China and Persia in their ranks to enable them to take fortified cities, although this would not have been practical in the fast campaign of Jebe and Subutai. This was the army now marching to face the Bulgars on the Volga.

Battle
During the battle with the Bulgars on the shores of Dnieper river, a messenger arrived from Genghis Khan, ordering his generals Subutai and Jebe to return to the Volga river, locate Jochi, and return with him to Mongolia.

According to historian John Chambers,  

Jochi brought a single tumen (10,000 men) to reinforce the army of Subutai and Jebe, meeting on the west bank of the Volga. The old directive was no longer in force per the orders from the messenger, but the return journey home allowed them to reconnoiter the northwestern boundaries of the Mongol Empire. Before advancing further north, the Mongols attacked Bulgar camps along the west bank of the Volga.

According to historian Peter Jackson, the most accurate translation of the passage is contained in D.S. Richards' book, The Chronicle of Ibn al-Athir for the Crusading Period from al-Kāmil fī'l-ta'rīkh, quoted below:

This passage describes the Volga Bulgars as successfully luring the Mongols into an ambush, in which the Mongols were defeated. Various discrepancies still exist concerning the details of the combatants. Older sources speculate about the losses of the battle, but in Jackson's opinion, the second passage refers to the size of Jebe and Subutai's army, not the number of Mongol "survivors" of the ambush. However, there is no mention in the alternative version of any such encounter with the Bulgars.

In this version of events, no mention was made of who commanded the scouting parties that were ambushed, or how many soldiers were present. Historian A.H. Halikov identifies the Bulgar army commander as Ilham Khan. 

It may be significant that, upon the return of the Mongol forces to Mongol territory, Jochi entered his father Genghis Khan's tent, knelt before the throne, and placed the Khan's hand upon his forehead, the Mongol stance for submission.

However, Jebe and Subutai were capable Mongol commanders, well-versed in the art of the ambush. It seems unlikely that the forces of a weakened Bulgar state would have been able to overpower such an experienced Mongol force. Some historical secondary sources—such as Morgan, Chambers, and Grousset—state that it was in fact the Mongols who defeated the Bulgars. Chambers claims that the Bulgars made up stories to tell the recently defeated Ruthenians that it was they who had beaten the Mongols, and driven them from their territory.
    
Whatever the case may be, the events after the battle are not disputed. The Mongols advanced towards the Urals, defeated the Saxon tribes there, and then proceeded south to engage the eastern Cumans, Kipchaks, and Kanglis, whose army was destroyed and their khagan slain. As with so many other defeated peoples before them, they too paid a hefty ransom to avoid their annihilation.

Aftermath

Despite this defeat, the Mongol Horde was not weakened as they continued their conquests of eastern Europe. However, the Mongol expedition's repeated attacks depleted the local Saxon tribes. After the Saxons fell, they went on to defeat the Kanglis. With plenty of treasure in tow, the Mongols returned to their homeland in the steppes, but suffered many losses en route. General Jebe died of a fever on the Imil River in Tarbagatai on the journey home.

A few years later, the Mongols under Batu Khan and General Subutai returned and conquered Volga Bulgaria. It became part of the Mongol Empire in 1236, marking the end of six centuries of the Volga Bulgarian state.

References

Bibliography 

  История Татарстана, Казань, "ТаРИХ", 2001. (History of Tatarstan)
  История Татарской АССР, Казань, Татарское книжное издательство, 1980 (History of the Tatar ASSR)
 Richard A. Gabriel, Genghis Khan's Greatest General:Subotai the Valiant, University of Oklahoma Press, 2006
 I. Zimonyi,"The First Mongol Raid against the Volga-Bulgars," Altaic Studies. Papers at the 25th Meeting of the PIAC at Uppsala, 1982, eds. G. Jarring and S. Rosén (Stockholm, 1985)
 D.S. Richards, The Chronicle of Ibn al-Athir for the Crusading Period from al-Kāmil fī'l-ta'rīkh. Part 3: The Years 589–629/1193–1231, The Ayyūbids after Saladin and the Mongol Menace., vol.3 (Ashgate, 2008)

History of Tatarstan
Volga Bulgaria
Samara Bend
1223 in Europe
Samara Bend